"Just Go" is a song by American singer Lionel Richie. It was written and produced by Akon and Giorgio Tuinfort for his ninth studio album Just Go (2009). The song, a duet with Akon, was released on March 12, 2009, as the album's second single. "Just Go" peaked at number 11 on the US Adult Contemporary chart.

Critical reception
Following its UK release, "Just Go" was described by Pete Lewis from Blues & Soul as "a seductively tuneful single with a Caribbean-tinged lilt."

Music video
In the music video, directed by Dominican film maker Jessy Terrero, a young man comes by his girlfriend's workplace to take her out on her birthday. Her manager kindly tells her to go and that he'll cover for her. Richie and Akon then appear, singing the song in a tropical paradise.

Charts

Weekly charts

Year-end charts

References

2009 songs
2009 singles
Akon songs
Lionel Richie songs
Songs written by Akon
Songs written by Giorgio Tuinfort
Island Records singles
Male vocal duets